Senioritis is the colloquial name for the decreased motivation toward studies displayed by students who are nearing the end of their high school, college, and graduate school careers, or the end of the school year in general, though is mostly said to occur in senior-level students. Senioritis is not a professionally recognized medical condition, but a colloquial term (in the United States and Canada) that combines the word senior with the suffix -itis, which technically denotes inflammation but refers to a general illness in colloquial speech.

Consequences 

In more serious cases, where students allow their grades to drop significantly, to the point of even failing, universities may rescind offers of admission. Nonetheless, most colleges rarely rescind, and even the most elite schools only revoke a very small number of students. Neglect towards schoolwork in high school may cause incoming college freshmen not to be as adequately prepared for the rigor of college level studies, and may decrease their ability to gain entrance scholarships. 

The time gap between college and university admissions, which are usually decided by March or April, and final exams, which usually are not until early May (e.g. Advanced Placement and International Baccalaureate classes), provides a challenge to seniors who may be feeling unmotivated toward their schooling.

Strategies to avoid senioritis 
There are four ways in which anyone dealing with potential seniorities can try, in order to avoid it all together. Starting with setting goals for yourself, including both short and long term, in hopes to keep yourself motivated. The second strategy being taking a break and resetting your mind and body, by assigning yourself study breaks, and breaks to go do something fun and not academic. Strategy number three being all about rewarding your accomplishment, no matter the size. This one will help maintain as sense of pride and acknowledge what you have done. Lastly, not staying in the same spot for too long. This one is big for those who like to spend hours on end studying in one location. Change up your spot to keep the knowledge flowing.

Proposed solutions 
James Coleman, writer and Chairman of the President's Panel of Youth, urged changes in the high school curriculum to address the problem of senioritis. These concerns gave rise to the implementation of a "Senior Semester" in many high schools throughout the country, which allowed seniors to spend time outside the school or attend seminars in their specific interests.

The College Board, the National Youth Leadership Council, and other youth-serving organizations suggest that there are many ways schools can help young people make the most of their senior year instead of succumbing to the temptation to take it easy once graduation is assured. Giving young people opportunities to make their academic work more meaningful through service-learning, or other forms of experiential education, can increase students' academic aspirations.

See also
Student syndrome

References

External links

The College Board: What to do About Senioritis
Tate Thompson. . June, 2003.

Education issues
Students
Student culture
Motivation